Zinc finger protein 695 is a protein that in humans is encoded by the ZNF695 gene.

See also 
ZNF692

References

Further reading 

Human proteins